The City of Brimbank is a local government area located within the metropolitan area of Melbourne, Victoria, Australia. It comprises the western suburbs between 10 and 20 km west and northwest from the Melbourne city centre.

The City has an area of 123 km² and in June 2018, Brimbank had a population of 208,714.

History
The Wurundjeri people have been the custodians of the land in the Port Phillip Bay region, including the current City of Brimbank, for over 40,000 years before European settlement. Brimbank lies within the area occupied by the Kurung-Jang-Balluk and Marin-Balluk clans of the Wurundjeri people (also known as the Woiwurung language group) who form part of the larger Kulin Nation. Other groups who occupied land in the area include the Yalukit-Willam and Marpeang-Bulluk clans.

Brimbank was founded on 15 December 1994 during the amalgamations of local councils by the state government. It was formed after the merger of the former Cities of Keilor and Sunshine. It was named after Brimbank Park in Keilor, which itself was named for the practice of local farmers driving livestock "around the brim of the bank" of the Maribyrnong River.

The municipality has thirteen places listed on the Victorian Heritage Register.

Misconduct investigations and dismissal
In 2008 and 2009, the Brimbank City Council was the subject of several investigations into alleged misconduct by councillors.

On 30 July 2008, the state MP for Keilor, George Seitz, invoked parliamentary privilege in the Legislative Assembly to accuse former Brimbank mayor Cr Natalie Suleyman of branch stacking, describing her as the "Robert Mugabe of Brimbank". Seitz alleged that Suleyman had 'retaliated' by directing Council to block funding for capital works projects after she was defeated in Labor Party preselection for the 2008 Kororoit state by-election. Following disclosures made under the Whistleblowers Protection Act 2001, the Victorian Ombudsman, George Brouwer, commenced an investigation into the Council in September.

Brouwer's report was presented to Parliament on 7 May 2009, and found councillors were "generally dysfunctional", "lacked awareness of their role", and were "influenced" by unelected third parties. The report asserted that between 2005 and 2008, decisions were reached by a majority (or 'ruling') faction of councillors who would vote on decisions as a bloc. Of the 6 members of the 'ruling faction', only two were re-elected to council in 2008.

The report concluded that:
 External parties, including state MPs George Seitz and Theo Theophanous, and former federal MP Andrew Theophanous, had unduly influenced council business,
 The 'ruling faction' "did not exercise reasonable care" in directing Brimbank CEO Marilyn Duncan to remove funding for the Keilor Lodge Reserve project,
 The 'ruling faction' intended to "worry" Seitz by calling for expressions of interest on the Keilor Lodge Reserve site,
 Cr Suleyman acted "with inappropriate partiality" in prioritising works at Cairnlea Park in the Council's 2008–09 budget,
 Cr Eriksson contravened the Council's Code of Governance by releasing confidential information to the Sunshine Advocate, Brimbank Leader and Brimbank Star newspapers,
 The Labor Party had appeared to breach the Electoral Act by distributing prohibited material to Cr Capar,
 Councillors had misused council-owned laptops and BlackBerry devices,
 Council had failed to handle the severance package of outgoing CEO Marilyn Duncan "in an open and transparent manner",
 The 'ruling faction' had determined the election of mayor until 2013, and
 Local Government Victoria had failed to adequately deal with complaints from residents about Council decision-making.

In response to the Brouwer report, the Minister for Local Government, Richard Wynne, appointed William Scales to closely monitor the council over a three month period. In his second report Scales found that, despite being closely monitored, there remained widespread misconduct amongst councillors, and recommended that councillors should be suspended or dismissed from their positions. David Walker, a former police detective, was also appointed to investigate possible breaches of the Local Government Act.

On 15 September, Wynne announced that Council would be dismissed, with administrators appointed until November 2012. On 17 November, the Victorian Government appointed Peter Lewinsky, Joanne Anderson and Meredith Sussex as administrators for a three-year period. Investigations into the conduct of Seitz, along with councillors Suleyman, Kathryn Eriksson and Troy Atanasovski, concluded in December with the Local Government Inspectorate informing those involved that it would take no further action.

In May 2012, the Victorian Government announced it would extend the tenure of administrators for a further three years, with Lewinsky reappointed alongside John Watson and former Brimbank commissioner Jane Nathan.

In October 2016, council elections were held in Brimbank for the first time in eight years. Two former councillors were re-elected: Sam David and Margaret Giudice, the latter having rescinded her Labor Party membership in 2014.

Wards and councillors
For electing councillors Brimbank is divided into the following wards:
 Grasslands Ward (includes the suburbs of Albanvale, Cairnlea, Kings Park, Deer Park and St Albans West) with 3 Councillors.
 Harvester Ward (includes the suburbs of Albion, Ardeer, Brooklyn, Derrimut, Sunshine, Sunshine North and Sunshine West) with 3 Councillors.
 Horseshoe Bend Ward (includes the suburbs of Keilor Park, Keilor East, Kealba, Tullamarine, St Albans East, Keilor and Tullamarine) with 2 Councillors.
 Taylors Ward (includes the suburbs of Calder Park, Keilor North, Keilor Lodge, Keilor Downs, Taylors Lakes, Delahey, Sydenham and Hillside) with 3 Councillors.

Mayors

Mayors (1998– 2009)

Administrators (2009–2016)

Mayors (2016–present)

Demographics

Townships and localities
The 2021 census, the city had a population of 194,618 up from 194,319 in the 2016 census

^ - Territory divided with another LGA

References

Bibliography

 Alt URL

External links
 
 
 Metlink local public transport map
 City of Brimbank at the Local Government Victoria website

Local government areas of Melbourne
Greater Melbourne (region)